Stern Pinball Arcade is a pinball simulation video game developed by FarSight Studios and a spin-off of their earlier title The Pinball Arcade. This game includes recreations of pinball machines manufactured or licensed by Stern Pinball Inc., which also owns the rights to machines from Data East and Sega Pinball.

Stern Pinball Arcade is available for Android, iOS, Microsoft Windows and macOS (through Steam), PlayStation 4, Xbox One, Samsung Gear VR, Nintendo Switch.

Development
The game was announced on September 20, 2015 by FarSight Studios in partnership with Stern Pinball Inc. The game was revealed on May 2, 2016 to promote the subsequently cancelled Kickstarter campaign for the AC/DC pinball machine. Due to a new partnership, the intended funding was no longer necessary.

The first four tables launched for the game on Samsung Gear VR included Ripley's Believe It or Not!, Mary Shelley's Frankenstein, Star Trek and Starship Troopers. With the exception of Star Trek, these tables were previously released for The Pinball Arcade.

The Steam (Windows) version released on December 22, 2016 to "Very Negative" reviews, owing to widespread frustration with an apparently incomplete and buggy interface and inability to purchase DLC. Players recommending the game praised Farsight granting access to tables already purchased for The Pinball Arcade and expressed hope that issues would be resolved in the future.

Tables

Table key

Published

See also
The Pinball Arcade

References

External links
The official Stern Pinball Arcade website

2016 video games
Pinball video games
FarSight Studios games
Android (operating system) games
IOS games
MacOS games
PlayStation 4 games
Windows games
Xbox One games
Video games developed in the United States
Stern pinball machines